Ptilotus spathulatus (R.Br.) Poir. (pussy tails) is a species of perennial herbs in the genus Ptilotus, native to Western Australia, South Australia, Victoria, New South Wales and Tasmania. It is the only species of Ptilotus that occurs in Tasmania.

References 

spathulatus
Endemic flora of Western Australia
Eudicots of Western Australia